Kim Il-yeop or Kim Iryŏp, (28 April 1896 – 28 May 1971) was a Korean writer, journalist, feminist activist, and Buddhist nun. Her given name was Kim Wonju. Her courtesy and dharma name was Iryeop.

Life 
Kim Iryeop was born to a Methodist pastor and his wife in a northern part of the Korean Empire and became a modern literary, Buddhist and feminist thinker and activist.

Having completed her primary education after the death of her parents, she moved to Seoul to attend Ehwa Hakdang (1913-1915), which later became Ewha Girls' High School. In 1915 she moved on to Ewha Hakdang (now Ewha Womans University). She completed her education at Ewha in 1918 and married a professor of Yeonheui Junior College.

In 1919, Iryeop went to Japan to continue her studies and returned to Korea in 1920. Upon returning, she launched a journal, New Woman, which is credited to be the first women's journal in Korea that was published by women for the promotion of women's issues.

Iryeop influenced the Korean literary society of her time by writing about activities that reflected trends in the women's liberation movement and this was her impetus for her founding New Woman. Over the years, a great number of her critical essays, poems and short novels about women's liberation struggling against the oppressive traditions of the period of Korea under Japanese rule were published in such Korean-language daily newspapers as The Dong-a Ilbo and The Chosun Ilbo, as well as in literary magazines including Kaebyeok and Chosun Mundan (Korea Literary World).

Iryeop ordained as a Buddhist nun in 1933 and moved into Sudeoksa in 1935, where she lived until she died.

Works

Books 
 Reflections of a Zen Buddhist Nun (어느 수도인의 회상, 1960)
 Having Burned Away My Youth (청춘을 불사르고, 1962)
 In Between Happiness and Misfortune (행복과 불행의 갈피에서)

Novels 

 《Revelation(啓示)》(계시, 1920)
 《I go: An agape and a sob story》(나는 가오: 애연애화, 1920)
 《A girl's death》(어느 소녀의 사, 1920)
 《Hye-Won》(혜원, 1921)
 《Death of Chaste love》(순애의 죽음, 1926)
 《Self-awareness》(자각, 1926)
 《Love》(사랑, 1926)
 《Dress-up》(단장, 1927)

Essays 

 《Let youth last forever》(청춘을 영원하게, 1977)
 《When the flowers fall, My eyes get cold》(꽃이 지면 눈이 시려라, 1985)
 《Left behind attachment》(두고간 정, 1990)
 《What have you become to me》(당신은 나에게 무엇이 되었삽기에, 1997)

English translation
Jin Y. Park, trans. Reflections of a Zen Buddhist Nun: Essays by Zen Master Kim Iryop (Honolulu, HI: University of Hawaii Press, 2014).

See also 
 Sudeoksa
 Mangong
 Chunseong

References

Sources
Jin Y. Park, "Gendered Response to Modernity: Kim Iryeop and Buddhism." Korea Journal, Spring 2005.
Jin Y. Park, "Women and Buddhist philosophy: Engaging Zen master Kim Iryŏp." Honolulu: University of Hawaiʻi Press, 2017.

External links 
 
 Buddhist nun Il-yeop - at The Korea Times
 本映画のあらすじ(脚本・準備稿より) 
 〈朝鮮近代史の中の苦闘する女性たち〉　女性雑誌編集者・金一葉 
 Kim Il-yeop 
 Kim Il-yeop:Navercast 

1896 births
1971 deaths
Korean scholars of Buddhism
Korean Buddhist nuns
Korean writers
Korean women poets
Korean educators
Korean scholars
Korean revolutionaries
20th-century Korean women
Free love advocates
Korean journalists
South Korean feminists
Free sex activists
Korean independence activists
20th-century Korean poets
20th-century women writers
20th-century Buddhist nuns
20th-century journalists